The following is a list of cities renamed by Azerbaijan in the recent past.

Mardakert → Ağdərə (1991)
Aşağı Ağcakənd → Şaumyanovsk (1938) → Aşağı Ağcakənd (1990)
Astraxan-Bazar → Cəlilabad (1967)
Beyləqan → Zhdanov (1939) → Beyləqan (1991)
Biləsuvar → Puşkino (1938) → Biləsuvar (1991)
Dəvəçi → Şabran (2010)
Duvannı → Sanqaçal
Gəncə → Elisabethpol (1805) → Gəncə (1918) → Kirovabad (1935) → Gəncə (1989)
Goranboy → Qasım-İsmayılov (1938) → Goranboy (1990)
Helenendorf → Yelenino → Xanlar (1938) → Göygöl (2008)
Karyagino → Füzuli (1959)
Krasnaya Sloboda → Qırmızı Qəsəbə (1991)
Xonaşen → Martuni → Xocavənd (1991)
Noraşen → İliç[evsk] → Şərur (1991)
Petropavlovka → Petropavlovsk → Sabirabad (1931)
Port-Ilich → Liman (1999)
Prishib → Göytəpə
Qutqaşen → Qəbələ (1991)
Qazı-Məmməd → Hacıqabul
Şəki → Nuxa (1840) → Şəki (1968)
Şəmkir → Şamxor → Şəmkir (1991)
Tərtər → Mir-Bəşir (1949) → Tərtər (1991)
Traubenfeld → Vinogradnoe Pole → Tovuz
Vartaşen → Oğuz (1991)
Xankəndi → Stepanakert (1923) → Xankəndi (1991)
Yelizavetinka → Lüksemburq → Ağstafa (1939)
Yeni Şamaxı → Ağsu
Zubovka → Əli-Bayramlı (1938) → Şirvan (2008)
Pirçivan → Zəngilan (1957)

See also
List of renamed cities in Armenia
List of renamed cities in Georgia

 
Azerbaijan, Renamed
Renamed cities in Azerbaijan
Azerbaijan